The 2019 Croatian Football Super Cup was the twelfth edition of Croatian Football Super Cup, a football match contested by the winners of the Croatian First League and Croatian Football Cup. The match was played on 13 July 2019 at Stadion Maksimir in Zagreb between 2018–19 Croatian First League winners Dinamo Zagreb and 2018–19 Croatian Football Cup winners Rijeka.

Match details

References 

 Croatian Football Super Cup at HNS-CFF.hr
 Croatian Football Super Cup at HRnogomet.com

2019
GNK Dinamo Zagreb matches
HNK Rijeka matches
Supercup